This is a full list of cast and crew members, and guest appearances of the MTV stunt television and movie series Jackass.

Main cast members
 Johnny Knoxville
 Bam Margera
 Steve-O
 Ryan Dunn
 Chris Pontius
 Dave England
 Jason "Wee Man" Acuña
 Ehren McGhehey
 Preston Lacy

New cast members
 Sean "Poopies" McInerney
 Zach Holmes
 Jasper Dolphin
 Eric Manaka
 Rachel Wolfson

Film crew
 Jeff Tremaine
 Spike Jonze
 Dimitry Elyashkevich
 Sean Cliver
 Rick Kosick
 Trip Taylor
 Greg "Guch" Iguchi
 Lance Bangs
 Knate Lee
 Cordell Mansfield
 Shanna Zablow Newton
 J.P. Blackmon
 Ben "Benzo" Kaller
 Joe Frantz
 Seth Meisterman
 Rob "Whitey" McConnaughey
 Greg Wolf
 Derek Freda
 Matthew Kosinski

Recurring cast members
 Brandon DiCamillo
 Chris Raab (a.k.a. Raab Himself)
 Rake Yohn
 Brandon Novak
 April Margera
 Phil Margera
 Jess Margera
 Vincent Margera (a.k.a. Don Vito)
 Loomis Fall
 Manny Puig
 Compston "Dark Shark" Wilson
 Mike Kassak
 Stephanie Hodge
 Dave Carnie
 Chris Nieratko

Special guest appearances/crew members

A
 Erik Ainge
 Marilynn Allain 
 Jared Allen 
 Daniel Alvarez
 Vincent Alvarez
 Eric André
 Chris "Hoofbité" Aspite

B
 Will "The Farter" Bakey
 Edward Barbanell
 Dorothy Barnett
 Kenny Bartram
 Beavis
 Derrick Beckles
 Andy Bell
 Becky Bell
 Brian Bell
 Tory Belleci
 Travis "Taco" Bennett
 Steve Berra
 Parks Bonifay
 Party Boy
 Lionel Boyce
 Lara Flynn Boyle
 Half Pint Brawlers
 Josh Brown
 Kobe Bryant
 Butterbean
 Butt-Head

C
 Georgina Cates
 Mike Carroll
 Jay Chandrasekhar
 Errol Chatham
 Vernon Chatman
 Shridhar Chillal
 Nitro Circus
 Madison Clapp
 Phil Clapp
 Rocko Clapp
 Mike Cook (a.k.a. Midget Mike)
 Allan Cooke
 Tré Cool
 Guy Cooper
 Maximillion Cooper
 Tyler, the Creator
 CKY
 CKY crew
 Rivers Cuomo

D
 Madison Davis
 Slater Davis
 Dave Decurtis (a.k.a. Naked Dave)
 Jason Deeringer
 Andy Dick
 P. Diddy
 Thor Drake
 The Dudesons
 Colton Dunn
 Rob Dyrdek

E
 Mike Ellis
 Seth Enslow

F
 Fatlip
 George Faughnan
 Seamus Frawley
 Odd Future

G
 Tony Gardner
 Willie Garson
 Ryan Gee
 Breana Geering
 Kerry Getz
 Shannon Gibbs
 Chad I Ginsburg
 Mark Gonzales
 David Gravette
 Charlie Grisham
 Trigger Gumm

H
 Davin "Psycho" Halford
 Scott Handley
 Chris Hanna
 Frank Hansen
 Greg Harris
 Zachary Hartwell
 Eddie Harvey (legend)
 Tony Hawk
 Kamber Hejlik
 Jukka Hildén
 Mat Hoffman
 Aaron "Jaws" Homoki
 Rick Howard
 George Hruska
 Mike Hudson
 Nigel Hudson (a.k.a. The UK Hammer)

J
 Juicy J
 Atiba Jefferson
 Terra Jolé
 Mike Judge

K
 Jim Karol
 Chris Kato
 Catherine Keener
 Machine Gun Kelly
 Jill Kill
 Jimmy Kimmel
 Michelle Klepper
 Evel Knievel
 Lemoyne Knoxville
 Eric Koston
 Nick Kreiss
 Naoko Kumagai

L
 Jarno Laasala
 Kristin Lane
 Bucky Lasek
 Chris Lawrence
 Gene LeBell
 Mikey LeBlanc
 Stevie Lee
 Brett Leffew
 Gary Leffew
 Jed Leffew
 Judd Leffew
 Brandon Leffler
 Jarppi Leppälä
 Bunny the Lifeguard

M
 Sam Maccarone
 Three 6 Mafia
 Marisa Magee
 Sean Malto
 Garbage Man
 Scott Manning
 Otmara Marrero
 Danny Masterson
 Grasie Mercedes
 Jesse Merlin
 Nick Merlino
 Deron Miller
 Minutemen 
 Ed Moore (a.k.a. Ed the medic)

N
 Francis Ngannou
 Jackson Nicoll
 T-Nigs

O
 Karen O
 Craig O'Connell
 Will Oldham
 Shaquille O'Neal
 Danielle O'Toole

P
 Natalie Palamides
 Missy Parkin
 HP Parviainen
 Tommy Passemante (a.k.a. Street Bike Tommy)
 Travis Pastrana 
 Project Pat
 DJ Paul
 Courtney Pauroso
 Smut Peddlers
 Patty Perez (a.k.a. Goddess Patty) 
 Brad Pitt
 Scott Plamer
 Jack Polick (a.k.a. Handsome Jack)
 Axe Pontius
 Scott Potasnik
 Gregory Powell (a.k.a. Special Greg)
 Tim Powers
 Matthew Probst
 Stephen Prouty

R
 Mark Rackley
 Jalen Ramsey 
 Jason "J2" Rasmus
 Chief Roberts
 Dave Roen
 Missy Rothstein
 Henry Rollins
 Joe Romeiro
 Erik Roner
 Michael Rooney
 Jeffrey Ross
 Don Ruffin

S
 Sarah de Sa Rego
 Jeff "Harley" Schneider 
 Seann William Scott
 Alia Shawkat
 Sarah Sherman
 Joseph Shirley
 Scott Shriner
 Gene Simmons
 Scott Simmons
 Angie Simms
 Ryan Simonetti
 Clyde Singleton
 Slash
 Sleepy
 Barry Owen Smoler
 Daewon Song
 Spanky Spangler
 Britney Spears
 Arthur H. Spiegel III
 Sam Spiegel
 Starcrawler
 Brent Stoller
 P.K. Subban
 Sergio Suberbie
 Priya Swaminathan
 Syd
 Jules Sylvester
 The Deadly Syndrome

T
 Jason Taylor
 Rip Taylor
 Van Toffler
 Bobby Tovey
 Dave Tremaine

V
 Ville Valo
 Jolene Van Vugt
 Ivan Victor

W
 Roger Alan Wade
 Al Walker
 Strider Wasilewski
 John Waters
 Ruby Wax
 David Weathers
 Weezer
 Andrew Weinberg
 Boyd Willat
 Luke Wilson
 Andrew W.K.
 Greg Wolf (a.k.a. Wolfie)
 James Woodard
 Dana Michael Woods

Y
 Yelawolf

Z
 Irving Zisman
 Mark Zupan

Jackass
Jackass (TV series)